John Frick (born 24 March 1957) is an Australian cricketer. He played four first-class matches for South Australia in 1976/77.

See also
 List of South Australian representative cricketers

References

External links
 

1957 births
Living people
Australian cricketers
South Australia cricketers
Cricketers from Adelaide